"Good as Gold" is a special mini-episode of the British science fiction television series Doctor Who that was first broadcast on CBBC (as part of Blue Peter) on 24 May 2012. It was written via a competition (Script to Screen) in which junior schools were asked to write a script including the Eleventh Doctor (Matt Smith) and an enemy of his. The competition was won by the children of Ashdene School. The mini-episode also featured Karen Gillan as Amy Pond.

The first Doctor Who Script to Screen special was "Death Is the Only Answer", which was broadcast as part of Doctor Who Confidential.

Plot

Amy reminds the Doctor he needs to have an adventure once in a while, the Doctor complies and sets the TARDIS to its "adventure setting". After a series of malfunctions, the ship lands in the middle of the London 2012 Olympic Games, where they are visited by a panicked Olympic runner, who claims he is being chased. His pursuer is revealed as a Weeping Angel, who is seeking to seize the Olympic Flame and rob the planet of the good will and spirit it symbolises. The Doctor vanquishes the Angel with the sonic screwdriver, and the runner resumes his mission. Before he leaves, he gives the Doctor his gold medal. As the Doctor prepares to embark on another adventure with Amy, the Weeping Angel begins to reform.

Reception

Robert Gonzalez of io9 stated that Steven Moffat chose the winning script "wisely" though he did find the premise of "a weeping angel that can chase somebody while being watched by thousands of Olympic Game spectators a little dubious". Kevin Fitzpatrick of ScreenCrush described the episode as "hokey" though enjoyed the indication that the Weeping Angels would return in the following series. Susana Polo writing for "girl geek" website The Mary Sue described it as "funny and cute" and stated that it "definitely should not be part of a serious effort to fit it into [Doctor Who] canon". Louisa Mellor of Den of Geek affirmed that the short episode should be viewed "in the spirit in which it was intended, i.e. some fun for primary school kids who love Doctor Who, the Olympics, and presumably, making their teachers happy".

References

2012 British television episodes
Eleventh Doctor episodes
Doctor Who mini-episodes